The 1998 Conference USA men's soccer tournament was the fourth edition of the Conference USA Men's Soccer Tournament. The tournament decided the Conference USA champion and guaranteed representative into the 1998 NCAA Division I Men's Soccer Championship. The tournament was hosted by the University of South Florida and the final games were played at the USF Soccer Stadium.

Bracket

Awards
Most Valuable Midfielder:
Jeff Houser, USF
Most Valuable Forward:
Kevin Alvero, USF
Most Valuable Defender:
Ryan Schwaigert, Memphis
Most Valuable Goalkeeper:
Skip Miller, USF

References

External links
 

Conference USA Men's Soccer Tournament
Tournament
Conference USA Men's Soccer Tournament
Conference USA Men's Soccer Tournament